The 1958 Sudanese coup d'état was a bloodless military coup which took place in Sudan on 17 November 1958.

The coup was effectively a self-coup, orchestrated by Prime Minister Abdallah Khalil (in office since 1956), against the civilian government formed following the 1958 parliamentary election. The government was a coalition between Khalil's National Umma Party (NUP) and the People's Democratic Party (PDP). Khalil simultaneously served as Minister of Defence in the government. The United States and Great Britain were aware of the plot.
 

The coup occurred on the day parliament was to convene. Khalil, himself a retired army general, planned the coup in conjunction with leading NUP members and the army's two senior generals, Ibrahim Abboud and Ahmad Abd al-Wahab, who became leaders of the new military regime. Khalil was not allowed to participate in the new government and was retired on a pension.

See also
History of Sudan#Independent Sudan (1956 to present)

References

Military coups in Sudan
Coup d'etat
Sudanese coup d'etat
1950s coups d'état and coup attempts
Sudanese coup d'état